Petr Hubáček (born September 2, 1979 in Brno, Czechoslovakia) is a former Czech professional ice hockey forward who played in the National Hockey League (NHL), Czech Extraliga, Swiss National League, Kontinental Hockey League (KHL), and Finnish Liiga.

His younger brother Radek Hubáček also played the sport professionally.

Playing career
Hubáček was drafted in the ninth round of the 1998 NHL Entry Draft by the Philadelphia Flyers. He played six games with the Flyers during the 2000–01 season and scored his only NHL goal in the team's season opener.

He joined HC Dynamo Pardubice after five seasons in Finland with JYP Jyväskylä of the Liiga on June 2, 2016.

Career statistics

Regular season and playoffs

References

External links

 

1979 births
Living people
Czech ice hockey centres
Dragons de Rouen players
Czech expatriate ice hockey players in Russia
HC Dynamo Pardubice players
HC Kometa Brno players
HC Neftekhimik Nizhnekamsk players
HC Vítkovice players
JYP Jyväskylä players
Milwaukee Admirals players
Philadelphia Flyers draft picks
Philadelphia Flyers players
Philadelphia Phantoms players
SC Bern players
Ice hockey people from Brno
Czech expatriate ice hockey players in the United States
Czech expatriate ice hockey players in Switzerland
Czech expatriate ice hockey players in Finland
Czech expatriate sportspeople in France
Expatriate ice hockey players in France